Into the Dead is a zombie-themed action video game developed by PikPok and released on December 6, 2012, for iOS, Android and Windows Phone 8 platforms. A sequel titled Into the Dead 2: Zombie Survival was released for Android, Apple, and the Nintendo Switch.

Gameplay
Players must run through a landscape teeming with zombies and move left or right to dodge them. The player has no choice but to move forward and get as far as possible before dying. Weapons can be picked up from supply crates as the player runs past.

Reception

The game has a Metacritic rating of 84/100 based on 11 critic reviews.

Digital Spy said "Into the Dead is one of the best uses of the first-person perspective on iOS, and an absolutely fantastic infinite runner for mobile devices." Gamezebo said "With Game Center online scoreboards and achievements that we will no doubt be struggling to top for weeks to come, and more modes promised in the near future, Into the Dead is a bit of a must-have for mobile - especially if zombies hit your spot." TouchArcade said "When it works, it works unbelievably well - and with no asking price for those early, heart-pounding moments, there's absolutely no reason not to get this game." Multiplayer.it said "Into the Dead breathes some fresh air into the endless run genre, delivering an atmospheric, intense and nonetheless free experience for your iOS devices." TouchGen said "One minor annoyance is the functionality of weapons; these cannot be aimed and are predominantly effective against zombies that are right in front of you." AppAdvice said "A refreshing take on the zombie game that while simple, and perhaps without longevity, is full of immersive atmosphere." VideoGamer.com said "Endless runners rarely offer up too much variety, but there is something oddly appealing about Into The Dead. Let's keep it simple: if you like zombies, buy it. Yeah." iFans said: "If you enjoy a zombie game on mobile and want the next level thrills and graphics then Into the Dead 2 is perfect for you."

References

External links 

2012 video games
Android (operating system) games
IOS games
Video games developed in New Zealand
Video games about zombies